"Gasolina" (Spanish and Portuguese for "gasoline") is a 2004 reggaeton song by Daddy Yankee.

Gasolina may also refer to:

Film and TV
 Gasolina (film), Guatemalan film

Music
"Gasolina", song by Bonde Do Rolê from album With Lasers 2007 
"Gasolina", song by the Mexican Christian rock band Rojo from Día de Independencia 2004

See also
Gasoline (disambiguation)